The 1983 Cork Senior Hurling Championship was the 95th staging of the Cork Senior Hurling Championship since its establishment by the Cork County Board in 1887. The championship began on 13 May 1983 and ended on 9 October 1983.

St. Finbarr's entered the championship as the defending champions in search of a fourth successive title.

The final was played on 9 October 1983 at Páirc Uí Chaoimh in Cork, between Midleton and St. Finbarr's, in what was their first ever meeting in the final. Midleton won the match by 1-18 to 2-09 to claim their third championship title overall and a first title in 67 years.

Youghal's Tony Coyne was the championship's top scorer with 2-27.

Team changes

To Championship

Promoted from the Cork Intermediate Hurling Championship
 Milford

From Championship

Regraded to the Cork Intermediate Hurling Championship
 Éire Óg

Declined to field a team
 University College Cork

Results

First round

Second round

Quarter-finals

Semi-finals

Final

Championship statistics

Top scorers

Top scorers overall

Top scorers in a single game

Miscellaneous

 Midleton qualified for the final for the first time since 1938.
 Midleton won the title for the first time since 1916 after a 67 year gap.

References

Cork Senior Hurling Championship
Cork Senior Hurling Championship